Gennaro (from the Latin Januarius, meaning "devoted to Janus") is an Italian masculine given name that may refer to the following notable people:

Gennaro Acampora (born 1994), Italian football midfielder
Gennaro D'Alessandro (c.1717–1778), Italian Baroque composer and harpsichordist
Gennaro Angiulo (1919–2009), American mafia underboss
Gennaro Annese (1604–1648), Italian revolutionary
Gennaro Arcucci (died 1800), Italian physician
Gennaro Armeno (born 1994), Italian football midfielder
Gennaro Astarita (c.1745–1805), Italian composer
Gennaro Auletta (born 1957), Italian philosopher
Gennaro Basile, 18th century Italian painter
Gennaro Bizzarro (born 1976), American attorney and Republican politician
Gennaro Bonafede (born 1990), South African racing driver
Gennaro Bracigliano (born 1980), French football goalkeeper
Gennaro Calì (c.1799—1877), Italian sculptor
Gennaro Chierchia (born 1953), Italian linguist  
Gennaro Cirillo (born 1961), Italian sprint canoer
Gennaro di Cola (c.1320–1370), Italian painter
Gennaro Delvecchio (born 25 March 1978) is an Italian football official and a former player
Gennaro Favai (1879–1958), Italian artist
Gennaro Federico (died 1744), Neapolitan poet and opera librettist
Gennaro Filomarino (1591–1650), Roman Catholic prelate
Gennaro Fragiello (born 1984), Italian football player
Gennaro Gallo (born 1984), Italian lightweight rower
Gennaro Gattuso (born 1978), Italian football player
Gennaro of Naples and Sicily, prince
Gennaro Giametta (1867–1938), Italian painter
Gennaro Granito Pignatelli di Belmonte (1851–1948), Italian Cardinal of the Roman Catholic Church
Gennaro Greco (1663–1714), Italian architectural painter 
Gennaro Iezzo (born 1973), Italian football goalkeeper
Gennaro Langella (1938–2013), American mafia boss
Gennaro Licciardi (1956–1994), Italian Camorrista
Gennaro Lombardi, Italian immigrant to the United States 
Gennaro Magri, Italian dancer, choreographer, pedagogue, and writer
Gennaro Maldarelli (c.1796–1858), Italian painter
Gennaro Manna (1715–1779), Italian composer
Gennaro Migliore (born 1968), Italian politician
Gennaro Monaco (born 1968), Italian association football player
Gennaro DiNapoli (born 1975), American football center and guard
Gennaro Di Napoli (born 1968), Italian middle-distance runner
Gennaro Negri, 19th-century Italian song composer
Gennaro Nunziante, Italian film director
Gennaro Olivieri (footballer) (1942-2020), Italian professional football player and coach
Gennaro Olivieri (television personality) (1922–2009), Swiss ice hockey referee and television personality
Gennaro Pantalena (1848–1915), Italian actor-manager and playwright
Gennaro Papa (1925–2018), Italian politician
Gennaro Papi (1886–1941), Italian operatic conductor
Gennaro Portanova (1845–1908), Italian cardinal of the Catholic Church
Gennaro Righelli (1886–1949), Italian film director, screenwriter and actor
Gennaro Rubino (1859–1918), Italian anarchist 
Gennaro Ruggiero (born 2000), Italian football midfielder
Gennaro Ruo (1812–1884), Italian painter
Gennaro Ruotolo (born 1967), Italian football midfielder and manager
Gennaro Sabatino (born 1993), Italian motorcycle racer
Gennaro Sanfelice (1622–1694), Roman Catholic prelate 
Gennaro Santillo (1908–1943), Italian football player
Gennaro Sardo (born 1979), Italian football right back
Gennaro Maria Sarnelli (1702–1744), Italian Roman Catholic priest
Gennaro Scarlato (born 1977), Italian association football defender and manager
Gennaro Scognamiglio (born 1987), Italian football player
Gennaro Serra, Duke of Cassano (1772–1799), Italian revolutionary and soldier
Gennaro Spinelli, Prince of Cariati (1780–1851), Italian politician and diplomat 
Gennaro Troianiello (born 1983), Italian football midfielder
Gennaro Tutino (born 1996), Italian football forward
Gennaro Ursino (1650–1715), Italian composer and teacher
Gennaro Verolino (1906–2005), Roman Catholic bishop and a diplomat for the Holy See
Gennaro Vitiello (1929–1985), Italian stage actor and director
Gennaro Volpe (born 1981), Italian football player and coach

See also
Genaro (surname)

Italian masculine given names